L3Harris Geospatial develops products for the visualization, analysis, and management of geospatial imagery and scientific data. The company develops products such as IDL, ENVI, and Jagwire which are used in a variety of industries including defense and intelligence, environmental, engineering, aerospace, medical imaging, and federal and civil governments worldwide.

History
The company's origin can be traced back to 1977 when David Stern was working at the University of Colorado on the Mariner Mars space probes. Stern developed a programming language called Mariner Mars Spectral Editor, which later evolved to IDL, Interactive Data Language, in order to supplement FORTRAN, specifically for data analysis and visualization. As his vision developed, Stern left the university and started working in his attic to improve the programming language. He incorporated Research Systems Inc. (RSI) and released IDL as a proprietary programming language for visualizing data. NASA Goddard Space Center and Ball Aerospace were among the company's early customers.

In 1994, the software package ENVI was released. Written in IDL, ENVI is the industry standard for image processing and analysis allowing GIS professionals, remote sensing scientists, and image analysts to extract information from geospatial imagery. RSI was acquired by Eastman Kodak as a wholly owned subsidiary in 2000. Four years later, RSI along with the Remote Sensing Systems division of Eastman Kodak, were sold to ITT Corporation and were renamed ITT Visual Information Solutions.

In 2011, ITT Corporation was divided into three standalone companies, and ITT Visual Information Solutions became part of Exelis Inc. along with ITT Defense and Information Solutions. ITT Visual Information Solutions was renamed again to the current Exelis Visual Information Solutions. Exelis Visual Information Solutions was purchased by Harris Corporation in 2015, becoming a subsidiary known as Harris Geospatial Solutions, Inc. In 2019, Harris Corporation merged with L3 Technologies, Inc. and became L3Harris Technologies, Inc.

Products

IDL

IDL (Interactive Data Language) is a scientific programming language used in particular areas of science, such as astronomy, meteorology, and medical imaging.

ENVI
ENVI is an off-the-shelf software program used to visualize, process and analyze geospatial imagery.

Jagwire
Jagwire is a data ingest, management, image exploitation, and information dissemination tool.

References

ITT Inc.
Remote sensing companies
GIS software companies
Geospatial intelligence organizations